Robert Percy Hooper (September 11, 1917 – September 2, 2001) was a Canadian freestyle swimmer who competed in the 1936 Summer Olympics in Berlin.

In 1936 he was a member of the Canadian team which finished seventh in the 4x200-metre freestyle relay.  In the 400-metre freestyle, as well as in the 1500-metre freestyle, he was eliminated in the first round. At the 1934 Empire Games he was a member of the Canadian team which won the gold medal in the 4×200-yard freestyle event.  Four years later at the Empire Games in Sydney he won the silver medal with the Canadian team in the 4×220-yard freestyle competition.

See also
 List of Commonwealth Games medallists in swimming (men)

External links 

 Robert Hooper's profile at Sports Reference.com

1917 births
2001 deaths
Swimmers from Vancouver
Canadian male freestyle swimmers
Olympic swimmers of Canada
Swimmers at the 1936 Summer Olympics
Swimmers at the 1934 British Empire Games
Swimmers at the 1938 British Empire Games
Commonwealth Games gold medallists for Canada
Commonwealth Games silver medallists for Canada
Commonwealth Games medallists in swimming
20th-century Canadian people
21st-century Canadian people
Medallists at the 1934 British Empire Games
Medallists at the 1938 British Empire Games